The 2002 Rally Finland (formally the 52nd Neste Rally Finland) was the ninth round of the 2002 World Rally Championship. The race was held over four days between 8 August and 11 August 2002, and was won by Peugeot's Marcus Grönholm, his 10th win in the World Rally Championship.

Background

Entry list

Itinerary
All dates and times are EEST (UTC+3).

Results

Overall

World Rally Cars

Classification

Special stages

Championship standings

Production World Rally Championship

Classification

Special stages

Championship standings

References

External links 
 Official website of the World Rally Championship

Rally Finland
Finland
Rally